Bird Island is an island in San Francisco Bay. It is in San Mateo County, California. It appears on a 2012 USGS map of the area.

References

Islands of San Mateo County, California
Islands of San Francisco Bay
Islands of Northern California